Finland has used five-digit numeric postal codes since the 1970s. The first and second digits designate the general area of the municipality of the address, while the last three designate a smaller region within that larger area. The numeric postal code is usually accompanied by a written name for the smaller region. 

Corporations receiving large amounts of mail may have their own postal codes, also consisting of a five-digit numeric code and the name of the company. 

A special postal code 99999 is used for the residence of the Finnish Joulupukki, Korvatunturi.

Notes

References 

Finland